Amphidromus floresianus is a species of air-breathing land snail, a terrestrial pulmonate gastropod mollusk in the family Camaenidae.

Distribution 
South Flores.

References

External links 

floresianus
Gastropods described in 1897